Steve Beck is the name of:

Steve Beck (chairman) (1957–2015), English football chairman
Steve Beck (director), American film director

See also
Steven Beck (disambiguation)